Muchacha italiana viene a casarse may refer to:

Muchacha italiana viene a casarse (1971 TV series)
Muchacha italiana viene a casarse (2014 TV series)
Muchacha italiana viene a casarse, a 1969 Argentine telenovela starring Alejandra Da Passano and Rodolfo Ranni